The following is a list showing the largest municipalities in the state of Wisconsin according to the 2000, 2010, and 2020 censuses.  This list includes all cities and villages with more than 10,000 inhabitants. The list does not include towns regardless of population, because they are not incorporated entities.

See also
 List of cities in Wisconsin
 List of towns in Wisconsin
 List of villages in Wisconsin
 Political subdivisions of Wisconsin

References

External links 

 League of Wisconsin Municipalities. Estimated Population per Square Mile of Land Area, Wisconsin Municipalities 
 Wisconsin Department of Administration. List of Wisconsin municipalities in alphabetical order
 Wisconsin Department of Health Services. Wisconsin Cities, Villages, Townships and Unincorporated Places Listing
 Wisconsin Legislative Reference Bureau. State of Wisconsin Blue Book 2013–2014 – state and local government statistics

Municipalities by population
Wisconsin